Woh Rehne Waali Mehlon Ki (English: She Who Lives in a Palace) is an Indian Hindi language Indian television series that aired on Sahara One channel. The series ran from 30 May 2005 and ended on 20 January 2011. It became the longest running television production of Rajshri Productions and the most successful show on the channel.

Plot
The successful show ran for five years. During the course of the first year of the show's run, the protagonist of the show is Rani Mittal (Reena Kapoor), a rich girl who gets married into a poor family and learns to adjust to lower middle class life. After the death of her first husband Raj Goel, her family gets her married to her husband's rich look-alike Prince Thapar.

20 Years later

During the second year of the show's run, after the deaths of Rani and Prince, their daughter Pari Thapar becomes the show's protagonist. Pari looks exactly like her mother. The show focuses on Pari's life, her first crush in college, her marriage to her soul-mate Saumya Parashar (Aamir Ali), and the many obstacles she has to face during her married life. Saumya dies after falling from a cliff, trying to save his cousin Sameer (Vikram Acharya). Pari, who is pregnant at that time, soon goes into labour. Dr. Manav Kumar, a famous obstetrician,  supervises her delivery. Coincidentally, Manav's wife, Pallavi, also delivers a baby boy on the same day, and her delivery is overseen by Manav's friend Dr. Saurav. Pallavi dies in childbirth, and Pari's newborn son dies, too. In order to save Pari from another shock, so soon after losing her husband, Manav selflessly hands over his son to her. Pari assumes that the baby is her own son, and brings him up. The child is named Shubham. In time, Dr. Manav begins to miss his son and often finds excuses to meet him. When Pari and her family object to this, Manav attempts suicide in a fit of depression. He survives but loses his balance of mind. Dr. Saurav tells Pari the truth about the exchange of babies in the hospital. She then decides to bring Manav and Shubham together. Pari marries Manav and nurses him back to his senses. Pari and Manav live happily with Shubham and also adopt a little orphan girl named Rani. A freak accident at school causes Rani to lose her eyesight but Manav and Pari take care of her. Then one day Pari has an accident, which leads to serious health complications. She realizes that she is dying and donates her eyes to Rani.

15 Years later

Both Manav and Pari dead, their children Shubham and Rani are both doctors. Rani marries Rishabh (Karan Grover), the son of an aristocratic family only to realise that Rishabh and his brothers have lost all their wealth. They live in a rundown house and constantly quarrel. Rishabh has no proper education and is indifferent to his wife. With great courage and patience, Rani sets about reforming her new family and restoring order to their home. Encouraged by her, Rishabh takes up a job. Slowly, love blossoms between the couple. Eventually they regain their inheritance and move into their grand ancestral house. However, their happiness is short-lived, as Rishabh and his brothers die in a tragic accident. Rani is left to fend for herself, her three widowed sisters-in-law, a blind uncle-in-law and two small children of Rishabh's brothers.

Rani and her family move to Mumbai. After many hardships, Rani and all her sisters-in-law get re-married. Rani's new husband, also named Rishabh (Sameer Sharma), is a wealthy businessman. Rani's new life with Rishabh and his large joint family is not easy. She faces many hurdles and goes through testing times. All ends well in the end and Rani lives happily ever after with her new family.

Cast
 
 Reena Kapoor as Rani Mittal / Rani Raj Goel / Rani Prince Thapar 
 Alok Nath as Yashvardhan Mittal, Rani's father
 Lata Sabharwal as Shalini Mittal / Shalini Puneet Agarwal
 Anupam Bhattacharya as Puneet Agarwal
 Arjun Punj / Kashif Khan as Raj Goel
 Prashant Bhatt as Manoj Goel
 Resham Tipnis as Aarti Manoj Goel
 Aanjjan Srivastav as Rajendra Goel
 Shagufta Ali as Surekha Rajendra Goel / Danima
 Kashif Khan / Arjun Punj as Prince Thapar
 Khyaati Khandke Keswani as Neha Prince Thapar
 Supriya Karnik as Sheena Jamnadas Thapar
 Anang Desai as Jamnadas (JD) Thapar
 Amrapali Gupta as Tanya Thapar
 Rushad Rana as Karan
 Gulrez Khan as Shilpa
 Karuna Pandey as Madhu
 Madhumalti Kapoor as Mai 
 Gaurav Gera as Deepak, Aarti's brother
 Manini Mishra as Sarla, Deepak's wife
 Aanchal Anand as Saloni Goel, Raj's Younger Sister
 Mehul Nisar as Saloni's Husband
 Tushar Dalvi as Rani's Eldest Brother-In-Law
Rupini as Sheetal Mittal, Rani's Elder sister
 Saurabh Dubey as Harikishan
 Ritu Vashisht as Komal Mittal / Jindal / Malhotra

Season 2
 Reena Kapoor as Pari Thapar / Pari Saumya Parashar / Pari Manav Kumar
 Aamir Ali as Saumya Parashar 
 Kanika Kohli as Khushi Thapar / Khushi Rohit Mehra
 Madhvi Gogate as Raksha Surendra Mehra
 Sushil Parashar as Surendra Mehra
 Ankur Nayyar as Rohit Mehra, Khushi's husband
 Iira Soni as Riya Mehra
 Gayatri Choudhari as Ishaana Parashar / Ishaana Aditya Thapar
 Hemant Thatte as Aditya (Aryan) Thapar, Ishana's husband
 Sonia Rakkar as Neha Prince Thapar
 Arun Bali as Vikrantraj Parashar
 Nimai Bali as Abhay Parashar
 Kamya Panjabi as Kamya Abhay Parashar
 Vikram Acharya as Sameer Parashar
 Usha Bachani as Shelly Vijay Parashar
 Nisha Sareen as Alisha Sameer Parashar
 Sanjeev Seth as Abhay Parashar
 Krutika Desai Khan as Kamya Abhay Parashar
 Supriya Shukla as Nirmala Sanjay Parashar
 Rajesh Balwani as Sanjay Parashar
 Farida Dadi as Mrs. Parashar (Saumya's Grandmother & Pari's Grandmother-in-law) 
 S. M. Zaheer as Vikrantraj Parashar
 Pramatesh Mehta as Gyanprakash Gupta (Sanjana's Father) 
 Niyati Joshi as Sulochana Gyanprakash Gupta (Sanjana's Mother) 
 Poonam Joshi as Sanjana Gupta, Saumya's friend who he has an affair with 
 Jaya Bhattacharya as Savitri
 Smita Singh as Chameli
 Tiya Gandwani as Mahika
 Shital Thakkar as Pallavi Manav Kumar 
 Vinay Jain as Dr. Manav Kumar
 Snehal Sahay as Dolly Kumar
 Rahul Nanda as Rakshit (Raxy)
 Parul Chauhan as Tina
 Rakesh Paul as Devprakash (DP) Kumar
 Pubali Sanyal as Jyoti Devprakash Kumar
 Badrul Islam as Rangeela
 Surendra Pal as Guruji
 Neelam Mehra as Damyanti Kumar
 Amita Nangia as Mahika's Mother
 Harsh Vashisht as Himesh
 Indu Verma as Jitisha
 Puneet Vashisht as Manav Sahni
 Arup Pal as Roshan Khanna
 Madhuri Sanjeev as Buaji
 Dinesh Thakkar as Raghu
 Sameer Chandra as Gopal
 Abhay Bhargava as Advocate Bajaj
 Shiv Kumar Verma as Mr. Kothari
 Faisal Sayed as Abhijeet Singhania
 Rudra Kaushish as Yash Singhania
 Shweta Rastogi as Jaylakshmi

Season 3
 Neha Janpandit / Reena Kapoor as Dr. Rani Kumar / Rani Rishabh Rathore / Rani Rishabh Johri
 Manoj Bidwai as Shubham Kumar, Manav's son
 Karan Grover as Rishabh Rathore, Rani's first husband and an aristocrat 
 Faizal Gazi as Varun Rathore
 Neha Desai as Payal Varun Rathore / Payal Shekhar Agarwal
 Akhil Ghai as Virat Rathore
 Poonam Gulati as Kamini Virat Rathore
 Aditya Sharma as Laddoo Rathore
 Aliraza Namdar as Harishchandra Rathore
 Renuka Bondre as Lilavati Harishchandra Rathore
 Yashodhan Rana as Dharam Rathore
 Bhairavi Raichura as Janki Dharam Rathore / Menka
 Parth Mehrotra as Jai Rathore
 Preeti Chaudhary as Rajni Jai Rathore / Rajni Deven Sharma
 Sameer Sharma as Rishabh Johri, Rani Kumar's second husband
 Abir Goswami as Akash Johri
 Ridheema Tiwari as Ayesha Johri
 Amit Singh Thakur as Pradeep Johri
 Suhasini Mulay as Nirmala Johri
 Guddi Maruti as Sweeti Johri
 Nirmal Soni as Sweeti's husband
 Vaquar Shaikh as Shekhar Agarwal
 Rita Bhaduri as Dadisa
 Neelam Mehra as Mrs. Sharma
 Anirudh Dave as Deven (Dev) Sharma
 Rajlaxmi Solanki as Mrs. Agarwal
 Pooja Verma as Chhavi Agarwal
 Nikhil Sahni as Raunak Agarwal
 Prinal Oberoi as Jaya
 Sheetal Maulik as Dimple
 Aamir Dalvi as Jeet
 Sonia Singh as Anjali
 Supriya Karnik as Mohini Johri
 Karishma Randhawa as Priya

References

External links
 Official Website
 Watch Official Episode Videos

Indian television soap operas
Sahara One original programming
Indian drama television series
2005 Indian television series debuts
2011 Indian television series endings